= Li Fuchao =

Chinese billionaire businessman

- Occupation: Businessman

Li Fuchao (born 1958) is a Chinese billionaire businessman. In December 2014, Li became a billionaire when the company he chairs and controls, Guilin Fuda automotive, debuted on the Shanghai Stock Exchange. He resides in Beijing, and is divorced.
